Flechas Division (Flechas = Arrows, in Spanish) was created from the Flechas Negras Brigade expanded into a Division sized unit. It served in the Aragon Offensive and the March to the Sea, in 1938, during the Spanish Civil War. Italians from the Corpo Truppe Volontarie served in these mixed Italo-Spanish Flechas (Arrows) units where the Italians provided the officers and technical personnel, while the Spanish served in the rank-and-file.  For its final campaign it was further strengthened and renamed Flechas Negras Division.

Order of battle 
Division "Flechas" - Mario Roatta
 Brigada Flechas Negras - Col. Sandro Piazzoni
 1st Regiment
 1st Battalion "Monte Jata"
 2nd Battalion "Bermeo"
 3rd Battalion "Munguia"
 Battery of 65/17
 2nd Regiment
 1st Battalion "Peña Amarilla"
 2nd Battalion "Santoña"
 3rd Battalion "Algorta"
 Battery of 65/17
 Assault Battalion "Laredo"
 Artillery Group
 Group of 75/27 "Vizcaya"
 Group of 75/27
 Battery of 20mm "Vizcaya"
 Battery of 37mm "Somorrostro"
 Engineer Company
 Logistics Section
 Sanitation Section
 Military Police Section
 Division transport
 Arditi Platoon

See also 
 Flechas Negras Division

Sources 
de Mesa, José Luis, El regreso de las legiones: (la ayuda militar italiana a la España nacional, 1936-1939),  García Hispán, Granada:España, 1994 

Military units and formations of the Spanish Civil War
Divisions of Italy in the Spanish Civil War